The Four-man bobsleigh competition at the 1980 Winter Olympics in Lake Placid was held on 23 and 24 February, at Mt. Van Hoevenberg Olympic Bobsled Run.

Results

References

Bobsleigh at the 1980 Winter Olympics